The men's singles table tennis event at the 2015 Pan American Games will be held between the 22 and 25 of July at the Atos Markham Pan Am Centre in Toronto, Canada. The winners of each the individual events will qualify to compete at the 2016 Summer Olympics in Rio de Janeiro, Brazil.

Schedule
All times are Central Standard Time (UTC-6).

Results

Round Robin
The round robin was used as a qualification round. The forty participants were split into groups of four. The top two players from each group advanced to the first round of playoffs. Groups were announced at the technical meeting the day before the competition began.

Group A

Group B

Group C

Group D

Group E

Group F

Group G

Group H

Group I

Group J

Playoffs

Top Half

Bottom Half

Final

References

Table tennis at the 2015 Pan American Games